The 2020 Oklahoma State Cowboys baseball team represents Oklahoma State University during the 2020 NCAA Division I baseball season. The Cowboys play their home games at Allie P. Reynolds Stadium through March 15 and at O'Brate Stadium beginning March 20 as a member of the Big 12 Conference. They are led by head coach Josh Holliday, in his 8th season at Oklahoma State.

On March 13, the Big 12 Conference canceled the remainder of the season due to the Coronavirus pandemic.

Previous season
The 2019 Oklahoma State Cowboys baseball team notched a 32–17 (14–9) regular season record and finished third in the Big 12 Conference standings. The Cowboys reached the 2019 Big 12 Conference baseball tournament championship game, where they defeated West Virginia to claim the program's third Big 12 title. Oklahoma State received the Big 12 Conference's automatic bid to the 2019 NCAA Division I baseball tournament and was selected as one of the sixteen Regional hosts (played in Oklahoma City). The Cowboys defeated Harvard, Nebraska, and Connecticut to win the Oklahoma City Regional but were eliminated from the NCAA tournament by Texas Tech in the Lubbock Super Regional.

Personnel

Coaching staff

Roster

Schedule and results

! style="background:#FF6600;color:white;"| Regular Season (13–5)
|- valign="top" 

|- bgcolor="#ffbbbb"
| February 14 || 7:00 pm || ESPN3 || at * || #19 || GCU Ballpark • Phoenix, AZ || L3–10 || Mechals(1–0) || Osmond(0–1) || – || 3,843 || 0–1 || – || StatsStory
|- bgcolor="#bbffbb"
| February 15 || 3:00 pm ||  || at Grand Canyon* || #19 || GCU Ballpark • Phoenix, AZ || W6–4 || Scott(1–0) || Ohl(0–1) || – || 1,406 || 1–1 || – || StatsStory
|- bgcolor="#ffbbbb"
| February 16 || 2:00 pm ||  || at Grand Canyon* || #19 || GCU Ballpark • Phoenix, AZ || L3–9 || McCarville(1–0) || Campbell(0–1) || – || 941 || 1–2 || – || StatsStory
|- bgcolor="#bbffbb"
| February 18 || 7:30 pm ||  || at #11 Arizona State* || #28 || Phoenix Municipal Stadium • Phoenix, AZ || W2–1 || Standlee(1–0) || Tolman(0–1) || Leeper(1) || 2,403 || 2–2 || – || StatsStory
|- bgcolor="#bbffbb"
| February 21 || 4:00 pm || ESPN+ || * || #28 || Allie P. Reynolds Stadium • Stillwater, OK || W17–2 || Scott(2–0) || Stevens(1–1) || – || 1,001 || 3–2 || – || StatsStory
|- bgcolor="#bbffbb"
| February 22 || 1:00 pm ||  || Texas–Rio Grande Valley* || #28 || Allie P. Reynolds Stadium • Stillwater, OK || W11–7 || Davis(1–0) || Aldaz(0–1) || – || 1,678 || 4–2 || – || StatsStory
|- bgcolor="#bbffbb"
| February 23 || 12:00 pm || ESPN+ || Texas–Rio Grande Valley* || #28 || Allie P. Reynolds Stadium • Stillwater, OK || W8–4 || Varela(1–0) || Ramos(0–2) || Standlee(1) || 456 || 5–2 || – || StatsStory
|- bgcolor="#bbffbb"
| February 25 || 3:00 pm || ESPN+ || Little Rock* || #28 || Allie P. Reynolds Stadium • Stillwater, OK || W9–1 || Bowman(1–0) || Beardsley(0–1) || – || 462 || 6–2 || – || StatsStory
|- bgcolor="#bbffbb"
| February 26 || 3:00 pm ||  || Little Rock* || #28 || Allie P. Reynolds Stadium • Stillwater, OK || W12–0 || Varela(2–0) || Smith(2–1) || – || 188 || 7–2 || – || StatsStory
|- bgcolor="#ffbbbb"
| February 28 || 3:00 pm ||  || #1 UCLA* || #28 || Dr Pepper Ballpark • Frisco, TX || L1–8 || Pettway(2–0) || Scott(2–1) || – || 1,100 || 7–3 || – || StatsStory
|- bgcolor="#ffbbbb"
| February 29 || 2:00 pm ||  || * || #28 || Dr Pepper Ballpark • Frisco, TX || L2–4 || Kirschsieper(2–0) || Campbell(0–2) || Acton(4) ||  || 7–4 || – || StatsStory
|-

|- bgcolor="#bbffbb"
| March 1 || 3:00 pm ||  || #15 Texas A&M* || #28 || Dr Pepper Ballpark • Frisco, TX || W8–5 || Leeper(1–0) || Miller(0–2) || – || 8,487 || 8–4 || – || StatsStory
|- bgcolor="#ffbbbb"
| March 3 || 4:00 pm ||  || * ||  || Allie P. Reynolds Stadium • Stillwater, OK || L10–11 || Juenger(1–0) || Cable(0–1) || – || 405 || 8–5 || – || StatsStory
|- bgcolor="#bbffbb"
| March 5 || 4:00 pm || ESPN+ || BYU* ||  || Allie P. Reynolds Stadium • Stillwater, OK || W2–0 || Scott(3–1) || McKeehan(1–1) || Leeper(2) || 382 || 9–5 || – || StatsStory
|- bgcolor="#bbffbb"
| March 6 || 4:00 pm || ESPN+ || BYU* ||  || Allie P. Reynolds Stadium • Stillwater, OK || W6–1 || Campbell(1–2) || Nielson(0–3) || – || 672 || 10–5 || – || StatsStory
|- bgcolor="#bbffbb"
| March 7 || 2:00 pm ||  || BYU* ||  || Allie P. Reynolds Stadium • Stillwater, OK || W8–3 || Osmond(1–1) || McLaughlin(2–2) || – || 1,320 || 11–5 || – || StatsStory
|- bgcolor="#bbffbb"
| March 10 || 4:00 pm || ESPN+ || * ||  || Allie P. Reynolds Stadium • Stillwater, OK || W22–4 || Davis(2–0) || Nolan(0–1) || – || 320 || 12–5 || – || StatsStory
|- bgcolor="#bbffbb"
| March 11 || 4:00 pm ||  || Saint Louis* ||  || Allie P. Reynolds Stadium • Stillwater, OK || W7–1 || Varela(3–0) || Balandis(0–1) || – || 420 || 13–5 || – || StatsStory
|- align="center" bgcolor="lightgrey"
| March 13 || 6:00 pm ||  || * ||  || Allie P. Reynolds Stadium • Stillwater, OK ||  ||  ||  ||  ||  ||  ||  || 
|- align="center" bgcolor="lightgrey"
| March 14 || 2:00 pm ||  || Fresno State* ||  || Allie P. Reynolds Stadium • Stillwater, OK ||  ||  ||  ||  ||  ||  ||  || 
|- align="center" bgcolor="lightgrey"
| March 15 || 1:00 pm || ESPN+ || Fresno State* ||  || Allie P. Reynolds Stadium • Stillwater, OK ||  ||  ||  ||  ||  ||  ||  || 
|- align="center" bgcolor="lightgrey"
| March 17 || 6:30 pm ||  || at Dallas Baptist* ||  || Horner Ballpark • Dallas, TX ||  ||  ||  ||  ||  ||  ||  || 
|- align="center" bgcolor="lightgrey"
| March 20 || 6:00 pm || ESPN+ || TCU ||  || O'Brate Stadium • Stillwater, OK ||  ||  ||  ||  ||  ||  ||  || 
|- align="center" bgcolor="lightgrey"
| March 21 || 3:00 pm || ESPN+ || TCU ||  || O'Brate Stadium • Stillwater, OK ||  ||  ||  ||  ||  ||  ||  || 
|- align="center" bgcolor="lightgrey"
| March 22 || 1:00 pm || ESPN+ || TCU ||  || O'Brate Stadium • Stillwater, OK ||  ||  ||  ||  ||  ||  ||  || 
|- align="center" bgcolor="lightgrey"
| March 24 || 6:00 pm || ESPN+ || * ||  || O'Brate Stadium • Stillwater, OK ||  ||  ||  ||  ||  ||  ||  || 
|- align="center" bgcolor="lightgrey"
| March 27 || 7:00 pm || LHN || at Texas ||  || UFCU Disch–Falk Field • Austin, TX ||  ||  ||  ||  ||  ||  ||  || 
|- align="center" bgcolor="lightgrey"
| March 28 || 5:30 pm || LHN || at Texas ||  || UFCU Disch–Falk Field • Austin, TX ||  ||  ||  ||  ||  ||  ||  || 
|- align="center" bgcolor="lightgrey"
| March 29 || 1:00 pm || LHN || at Texas ||  || UFCU Disch–Falk Field • Austin, TX ||  ||  ||  ||  ||  ||  ||  || 
|- align="center" bgcolor="lightgrey"
| March 31 || 6:30 pm ||  || Oklahoma ||  || ONEOK Field • Tulsa, OK ||  ||  ||  ||  ||  ||  ||  || 
|-

|- align="center" bgcolor="lightgrey"
| April 3 || 8:00 pm || ESPNU || Texas Tech ||  || O'Brate Stadium • Stillwater, OK ||  ||  ||  ||  ||  ||  ||  || 
|- align="center" bgcolor="lightgrey"
| April 4 || 3:00 pm || ESPN+ || Texas Tech ||  || O'Brate Stadium • Stillwater, OK ||  ||  ||  ||  ||  ||  ||  || 
|- align="center" bgcolor="lightgrey"
| April 5 || 1:00 pm || ESPN+ || Texas Tech ||  || O'Brate Stadium • Stillwater, OK ||  ||  ||  ||  ||  ||  ||  || 
|- align="center" bgcolor="lightgrey"
| April 7 || 6:00 pm ||  || at Wichita State* ||  || Eck Stadium • Wichita, KS ||  ||  ||  ||  ||  ||  ||  || 
|- align="center" bgcolor="lightgrey"
| April 9 || 6:00 pm || ESPN+ || at  ||  || Tointon Family Stadium • Manhattan, KS ||  ||  ||  ||  ||  ||  ||  || 
|- align="center" bgcolor="lightgrey"
| April 10 || 6:00 pm || ESPN+ || at Kansas State ||  || Tointon Family Stadium • Manhattan, KS ||  ||  ||  ||  ||  ||  ||  || 
|- align="center" bgcolor="lightgrey"
| April 11 || 4:00 pm || ESPN+ || at Kansas State ||  || Tointon Family Stadium • Manhattan, KS ||  ||  ||  ||  ||  ||  ||  || 
|- align="center" bgcolor="lightgrey"
| April 14 || 6:00 pm || ESPN+ || * ||  || O'Brate Stadium • Stillwater, OK ||  ||  ||  ||  ||  ||  ||  || 
|- align="center" bgcolor="lightgrey"
| April 17 || 6:30 pm ||  || at Oklahoma ||  || L. Dale Mitchell Baseball Park • Norman, OK ||  ||  ||  ||  ||  ||  ||  || 
|- align="center" bgcolor="lightgrey"
| April 18 || 6:00 pm || ESPN+ || Oklahoma ||  || O'Brate Stadium • Stillwater, OK ||  ||  ||  ||  ||  ||  ||  || 
|- align="center" bgcolor="lightgrey"
| April 19 || 4:00 pm || ESPNU || Oklahoma ||  || O'Brate Stadium • Stillwater, OK ||  ||  ||  ||  ||  ||  ||  || 
|- align="center" bgcolor="lightgrey"
| April 21 || 6:00 pm || ESPN+ || Dallas Baptist* ||  || O'Brate Stadium • Stillwater, OK ||  ||  ||  ||  ||  ||  ||  || 
|- align="center" bgcolor="lightgrey"
| April 24 || 5:30 pm ||  || at  ||  || Monongalia County Ballpark • Morgantown, WV ||  ||  ||  ||  ||  ||  ||  || 
|- align="center" bgcolor="lightgrey"
| April 25 || 3:00 pm ||  || at West Virginia ||  || Monongalia County Ballpark • Morgantown, WV ||  ||  ||  ||  ||  ||  ||  || 
|- align="center" bgcolor="lightgrey"
| April 26 || 12:00 pm ||  || at West Virginia ||  || Monongalia County Ballpark • Morgantown, WV ||  ||  ||  ||  ||  ||  ||  || 
|- align="center" bgcolor="lightgrey"
| April 28 || 6:00 pm ||  || at Oral Roberts* ||  || J. L. Johnson Stadium • Tulsa, OK ||  ||  ||  ||  ||  ||  ||  || 
|-

|- align="center" bgcolor="lightgrey"
| May 1 || 6:00 pm || ESPN+ || Oregon State* ||  || O'Brate Stadium • Stillwater, OK ||  ||  ||  ||  ||  ||  ||  || 
|- align="center" bgcolor="lightgrey"
| May 2 || 5:00 pm || ESPNU || Oregon State* ||  || O'Brate Stadium • Stillwater, OK ||  ||  ||  ||  ||  ||  ||  || 
|- align="center" bgcolor="lightgrey"
| May 3 || 1:00 pm || ESPN+ || Oregon State* ||  || O'Brate Stadium • Stillwater, OK ||  ||  ||  ||  ||  ||  ||  || 
|- align="center" bgcolor="lightgrey"
| May 8 || 6:00 pm || ESPN+ ||  ||  || O'Brate Stadium • Stillwater, OK ||  ||  ||  ||  ||  ||  ||  || 
|- align="center" bgcolor="lightgrey"
| May 9 || 3:00 pm || ESPN+ || Kansas ||  || O'Brate Stadium • Stillwater, OK ||  ||  ||  ||  ||  ||  ||  || 
|- align="center" bgcolor="lightgrey"
| May 10 || 1:00 pm || ESPN+ || Kansas ||  || O'Brate Stadium • Stillwater, OK ||  ||  ||  ||  ||  ||  ||  || 
|- align="center" bgcolor="lightgrey"
| May 12 || 6:00 pm || ESPN+ || * ||  || O'Brate Stadium • Stillwater, OK ||  ||  ||  ||  ||  ||  ||  || 
|- align="center" bgcolor="lightgrey"
| May 14 || 6:30 pm || ESPN+ || at  ||  || Baylor Ballpark • Waco, TX ||  ||  ||  ||  ||  ||  ||  || 
|- align="center" bgcolor="lightgrey"
| May 15 || 6:30 pm || ESPN+ || at Baylor ||  || Baylor Ballpark • Waco, TX ||  ||  ||  ||  ||  ||  ||  || 
|- align="center" bgcolor="lightgrey"
| May 16 || TBA || ESPN+ || at Baylor ||  || Baylor Ballpark • Waco, TX ||  ||  ||  ||  ||  ||  ||  || 
|-

| style="font-size:88%" | Legend:       = Win       = Loss       = Canceled      Bold = Oklahoma State team member
|-
| style="font-size:88%" | "#" represents ranking. All rankings from Collegiate Baseball on the date of the contest."()" represents postseason seeding in the Big 12 Tournament or NCAA Regional, respectively.

Rankings

2020 MLB draft

References

Oklahoma State Cowboys
Oklahoma State Cowboys baseball seasons
Oklahoma State Cowboys baseball